Wargame: Red Dragon is a real-time strategy video game developed by Eugen Systems and originally published by Focus Home Interactive, released on April 17, 2014. It is the sequel to the 2013 Wargame: AirLand Battle.

Gameplay
Wargame: Red Dragon is set in East Asia during an alternate history Cold War where the Soviet Union doesn't collapse and featuring five new Asia Pacific factions: China, North Korea, South Korea, Japan and the ANZAC. The battlefield is viewed from a top-down perspective, giving the player an overview of the action. The player can decide which units they want to deploy before a battle, creating a deck of specific individual units. The player can choose from infantry, various forms of armored units, air forces, and naval forces, with further customization available, e.g. choosing between infantry with anti-aircraft or anti-armor capabilities, or whether to deploy air-superiority aircraft or ones suited for supporting ground forces. The opposing sides will typically start on opposite sides of the battlefield, with both parties being awarded an initial number of deployment points, that determine how many units they can spawn at the start of the battle. Units in the game have several attributes such as their amount of fuel or ammunition; If a unit runs out of fuel or ammunition, it will be unable to move or shoot, respectively. Players can manage these attributes by deploying supply units, which repair and re-arm units. Units also have morale which can degrade under heavy attack, reducing the unit's combat effectiveness and potentially causing it to rout, leaving it unresponsive to player commands.

Following initial deployment, players must gradually hold and secure additional designated zones on the map by deploying special command units and supporting forces to them. Holding these zones awards the player with additional deployment points over time, allowing them to bring in additional units during the course of a battle. Any units ordered during the battle will arrive from a specific command point; a deployment zone typically located on the edge of the map from which units ordered will enter the battle. If such a point is lost, the player will be unable to call in reinforcements until it is re-secured. They will lose the game if they possess no units with which to capture a deployment zone. Other ways of losing include running out of units and having fewer points than the enemy at the end of the battle.

Downloadable Content (DLC)
The game features both free and paid DLC. The first three free DLCs add a number of multi-player maps as well as units to existing factions, while the paid DLC adds entirely new playable nations.

As of May 20, 2016, the Armed Forces of the Netherlands became a downloadable playable faction for the game. Unique Dutch vehicles such as the DAF YP-408 and the DAF YP-104, as well as a mix of British, French, German and American units licensed for Dutch use.

On June 23, 2016, Eugen Systems announced that the Israeli Defense Forces would become the second downloadable faction for the game. Unique Israeli Army equipment, most notably the Merkava series of tanks, are now available in game, alongside many other Israeli units.

With the announcement of the Israeli army DLC, Eugen also announced the ongoing work of a third DLC called Double Nation Pack: REDS, this time introducing Yugoslavia and Finland into the game as USSR allies. This DLC includes 186 new units and was released on December 1, 2016.

After a four-year absence of a DLC release for the game, Eugen announced on March 23, 2021, a new DLC for the South African Defence Force to the game adding 90 new SADF units, including 20 brand-new vehicle models, as well as many new variants. This DLC was released on September 30, 2021.

Reception

According to review aggregator Metacritic, Wargame: Red Dragon received generally favourable reviews after its release. IGN praised the game's graphics and audio, saying it "looks and sounds positively glorious", but criticises the game's naval simulations as "deeply silly" and asserts "the enemy AI does let down its side a little bit", ultimately summarising it as "a good game in a great series" getting "a qualified recommendation because of its weak naval warfare and its lack of several clever features that distinguish its predecessors."

See also

 List of PC exclusive titles
 Wargame: European Escalation
 Wargame: AirLand Battle
 Command: Modern Air/Naval Operations

References

External links
 

Alternate history video games
Real-time strategy video games
Video games developed in France
Focus Entertainment games
Windows games
Cold War video games
2014 video games
MacOS games
Linux games
Video games set in Hong Kong
Video games set in China
Video games set in South Korea
Video games set in North Korea
Video games set in Vietnam
Video games set in the Soviet Union
Video games set in Japan
World War III video games